The 2016 Chinese Artistic Gymnastics Championships were held from 11-15 May 2016 in Hefei, Anhui.

Medalists

Women's results

Team

All-around

Vault

Uneven bars

Balance beam

Floor exercise

References 

2016 in Chinese sport
Chinese Artistic Gymnastics Championships
Chinese Artistic Gymnastics Championships